"Bestie" is a song by English rapper Yungen, featuring English rapper/singer Yxng Bane. It is Yungen's highest charting single. It is also Yxng Bane's second-highest charting single, with his feature on "Answerphone" giving him a higher peak of #5 in 2018.

Music video
The music video for "Bestie" was released on Yungen's Vevo channel on 15 June 2017, one day before its official release on iTunes. As of April 2018, the video had accumulated over 30 million views. It was directed by Oliver Jennings and produced by Jack Hobbs. The video was shot in Dubai.

Charts

Weekly charts

Year-end charts

Certifications

References

2017 songs
2017 singles
Yxng Bane songs
RCA Records singles
Sony Music UK singles